Sweden held a general election on 15 September 1968, to elect the members of the Second chamber of the Riksdag. This was to be the final bicameral Riksdag elected. As of 2020, this was the final time a party has held an outright majority in the Riksdag after the Social Democrats won 125 out of the 233 seats.

National results

Regional results

Percentage share

By votes

Constituency results
The results of the various constituency coalitions between the centre-right parties have all been listed under "C/F/H".

Percentage share

By votes
The Left Party Communists did not participate in Gotland County, whereas various centre-right coalitions participated in Gotland and Fyrstadskretsen. This resulted in zero or nearly no votes in some cases.

Results by municipality
1968 was the penultimate election where the postal votes were counted separately from the polling station votes in one unified count across municipalities. The exception to these results are those where the whole constituency was one municipality - namely Gothenburg, Gotland and Stockholm where all postal votes were automatically denoted as part of said municipalities.

Only parties or constellations that got votes in any given constituency are listed.

Blekinge

Dalarna

Dalarna County was known as Kopparberg County at the time, but shared the same borders as in the 21st century.

Kopparberg County

Gotland
The Centre Party and People's Party merged as "Mittenpartierna" (the Middle Parties) in this constituency. Since the Middle Parties as a combination got fewer votes than the Rightist Party nationwide, they have been listed afterwards in this chart, even though both parties individually were larger both in the constituency and nationwide. The Left Party Communists did not participate in Gotland County altogether and thus received no votes. As a result, this party chart has fewer entries than elsewhere. Changes to a nationwide parliamentary threshold rendered these arrangements obsolete from the 1970 election onward.

Gävleborg

Halland

Jämtland

Jönköping

Kalmar

Kronoberg
The leftist bloc gained one more vote in Braås over the centre-right bloc, although both finished on 49.1%.

Norrbotten

Skåne
The province of Skåne, later unified into one county, was divided into Malmöhus and Kristianstad counties at the time, also resulting in three separate constituencies, one for each county and a third for the metropolitan area of Öresund, that was part of Malmöhus.

Four-city constituency
()
The centre-right parties participated under two different constellations Samling68 (Coalition68) including all three of the Centre Party, People's Party and the Rightist Party and the Mittenpartierna (the Middle Parties) including only the two former. These have been listed in place of their origin parties in the list order based on the national results.

Kristianstad

Malmöhus County

Stockholm
Stockholm County was divided into Stockholm Municipality and the surrounding county of suburbs or more rural areas.

Stockholm (city)

Stockholm County

Södermanland

Uppsala

Värmland

Västerbotten

Västernorrland

Västmanland

Västra Götaland
The later iteration of Västra Götaland County was divided into three separate counties and five constituencies in 1973. The three counties were Gothenburg and Bohuslän, Skaraborg and Älvsborg. Gothenburg/Bohus were divided into one constituency representing Gothenburg Municipality and one representing Bohuslän, whereas Älvsborg was divided into two constituencies, one in the north and one in the south. Skaraborg had one constituency for the whole county.

Bohuslän

Gothenburg

Skaraborg

Älvsborg N

Älvsborg S

Örebro

Östergötland

References

General elections in Sweden